Storaas is a surname. Notable people with the surname include:

Gaute Storaas (born 1959), Norwegian jazz musician (bass) and composer
Vigleik Storaas (born 1963), Norwegian jazz pianist and composer

Norwegian-language surnames